{{Infobox newspaper
| name                = The Daily Post
| image               = 
| caption             = Front page of the San Francisco Dailysfirst edition, May 3, 2006
| type                = Daily newspaper
| format              = Tabloid
| foundation          = May 3, 2006
| ceased publication  =
| price               =
| owners              = Independent
| publisher           = Dave Price and Jim Pavelich
| editor              =
| language            =
| circulation         =
| headquarters        = 324 High StreetPalo Alto, California, 94301
| ISSN                =
| website             = 
}}

The Daily Post (formerly known as the San Francisco Daily''') was a free newspaper based in the San Francisco, California area.

History
The Daily Post was owned by Dave Price and Jim Pavelich, who were the publishers of the Palo Alto Daily News and its sister papers in San Mateo, Burlingame, Los Gatos, Redwood City and Berkeley. They sold that chain of newspapers to Knight Ridder on February 15, 2005. Joining Price and Pavelich as owners is Amando Mendoza, former circulation director of the Palo Alto Daily News.Ex-Palo Alto publishers launch daily in SF The newspaper ceased operations in 2009.

See also
 Palo Alto Daily Post''

References

External links
 San Francisco Daily official website

Free daily newspapers
Daily newspapers published in the San Francisco Bay Area
2006 establishments in California